Interracial marriage is a marriage involving spouses who belong to different races or racialized ethnicities.

In the past, such marriages were outlawed in the United States, Nazi Germany, and apartheid-era South Africa as miscegenation. In 1960 interracial marriage was forbidden by law in 31 U.S. states. It became legal throughout the United States in 1967, following the decision of the Supreme Court of the United States under Chief Justice Earl Warren in the case Loving v. Virginia, which ruled that race-based restrictions on marriages, such as the anti-miscegenation law in the state of Virginia, violated the Equal Protection Clause (adopted in 1868) of the United States Constitution.

Legality 

Many jurisdictions have had regulations banning or restricting not just interracial marriage but also interracial sexual relations, including Germany during the Nazi period, South Africa under apartheid, and many states in the United States prior to the 1967 landmark Supreme Court case Loving v. Virginia.

Complications 
A 2008 study by Jenifer Bratter and Rosalind King conducted on behalf of the Education Resources Information Center examined whether crossing racial boundaries increased the risk of divorce. Comparisons across marriage cohorts revealed that, overall, interracial couples have higher rates of divorce, particularly for those that married during the late 1980s. A 2009 study by Yuanting Zhang and Jennifer Van Hook also found that interracial couples were at increased risk of divorce.

One consistent finding of this research is that gender is significantly related to divorce risk. Interracial marriages involving a White woman have a higher risk of divorce, as compared with interracial marriages involving Asian or Black women (interracial marriages involving Black women showed a decreased risk of divorce, lower than non-interracial marriages).

According to authors Stella Ting-Toomey and Tenzin Dorjee, the increased risk of divorce observed in couples with a White wife may be related to decreased support from family members and friends. They note that White women were viewed as "unqualified" by their non-White in-laws to raise and nurture mixed race children, due to their lack of experience in "navigating American culture as a minority". A 2018 study by Jennifer Bratter and Ellen Whitehead found that white women with mixed race children were less likely to receive family support than were non-white women with mixed race children.

In one study, White women married to Black men were more likely to report incidents of racial discrimination in public, such as inferior restaurant service or police profiling, compared to other interracial pairings. Such prejudicial factors may place these marriages at an increased risk of divorce.

A study published in 2008 reported a lower risk of divorce for inter-ethnic marriages between Hispanics and non-Hispanic Whites. However, another study, published in 2011, found that these intermarriages were at an increased risk of divorce. Gender was found to be related to the probability of divorce, with marriages involving White women and Hispanic men having the highest risk of divorce.

Benefits

Positive interracial encounters
A benefit of interracial marriages is that it increases the opportunity for positive interracial encounters. Research has found a reduction in prejudice and discrimination towards members of an out-group (someone from whom one has a different racial identity) when one has positive interracial encounters. For instance, a meta-analysis by Pettigrew and Tropp (as cited in Latson) found intergroup friendship was associated with decreased intergroup prejudice. This can be explained by the "Contact Hypothesis" which is the idea that intergroup contact under appropriate conditions can effectively reduce in-group out-group prejudice. This contact does not have to be direct, but it could also be vicarious. For instance, Wright et al. found Caucasians who report knowing another Caucasian with a cross-race friend had fewer negative attitudes about non-Caucasians regardless of direct level of contact.

They created a competition between two groups who thought the groups had been formed based on similarity. After an intergroup hostility had been established, participants observed a member of an in-group member (confederate) complete a task with an out-group person (also a confederate). The participant observed the confederate acting differently depending on the condition she observed. In the positive condition, the confederates hugged and greeted each other as pre-existing friends (positive condition). In the neutral condition, the confederates were polite to each other but not necessarily friendly. In the hostile condition, the confederates acted as if they were pre-existing enemies. Participants who were in the positive condition rated the out-group more positively on both negative characteristics such as "inflexible" and positive characteristics such as "intelligent." They concluded that merely observing a positive in-group member act positively towards an out-group member increases positive feelings towards the out-group This is a benefit of interracial marriages because they tend to involve the families and friends of the interracial partners coming together and forming relationships with one another. Consequently, this diversity within a family system can enhance open communication for individuals so that they have a deeper understanding of the views of different people.

Mixed-race children
A potential outcome of interracial marriage is multiracial children. There are both benefits and challenges that come with being multiracial. Multiracial people are perceived as more attractive than their monoracial peers. For instance, Rhodes et al. (as cited in Lewis) found that people of mixed Asian and European backgrounds were rated as more attractive than Europeans, Asians and even random faces generated as morphs between these two groups. Another recent study by Elena Stepanova (as cited in Latson) found that a group of black, Latino, white and Asian college students rated mixed-race faces more attractive.

Micheal B. Lewis suggests the reason multiracial people are perceived as more attractive is that genetic diversity makes people more attractive by virtue of their apparent greater "genetic fitness". In other words, others take the ethnically ambiguous faces as indicators of greater genetic diversity which is a cue for apparent healthiness. This is known as heterosis. A 2005 study conducted by Craig et al. (as cited in Latson) lends support to heterosis. The study focused on people who had inherited a different gene variant from each parent in a section of DNA playing a vital role in the regulation of the immune system. Heterozygous men –with two different versions of these genes –were more attractive to women than homozygous men (men with the same version of these genes). Although this study was not conducted on multiracial people, specifically, having parents of different races makes a person more likely to be heterozygous.
The upshot of this study is that heterosis is the reason multiracial people are perceived as more attractive. There is debate, however, over whether Heterozygotes are healthier or not. It has been shown heterozygotes are indeed more resistant to infectious diseases such as HIV. Other researchers, however, have failed to find a correlation between attractiveness and actual health, although this may be a result of advances in medicine in helping the less heterozygous overcome genetic susceptibility to illness.

However, a study conducted by Jennifer Patrice Sims found that generally mixed-race people were perceived as more attractive, but some racial mixes were not perceived as more attractive. This calls into question heterosis as an explanation for why mixed-race people are perceived as more attractive since, according to heterosis, all racial mixes should be perceived as more attractive than their monoracial counterparts. Moreover, attributing attractiveness to genetics alone ignores the role culture and socialisation has to play. Sims (as cited in Latson) argues the heterosis theory is overreaching and based on the false presumption of biologically distinct races. She asserts that attractiveness is a social construct and changes with time. For instance, the historical European ideal of a beautiful woman as having blonde hair, pale skin and blue eyes is different from contemporary ideals of beauty. For example, Rihanna is widely regarded as attractive, despite having very different features from the old ideal.

There are some challenges associated with being multiracial. For example, some multiracial people struggle with discerning who they are. A recent survey found a fifth of respondents feel pressure to claim just one race. A quarter felt confusion about what they are. The complexity that comes with how they choose to identify marks them out for a different sort of discrimination monoracial people endure. Sarah Gaither has found that multiracial people suffer from rejection from multiple racial groups. For instance, those with a black parent and a white parent may feel that they are not black enough to identify with a predominantly black group at school, and not white enough to identify with a predominantly white group at school.

However, there does seem to be an advantage to a multiracial person's complex identity. For instance, multiracial people can switch between their racial identities and navigate themselves well in different social groups. Gaither's research found that multiracial people report higher self-esteem, increased social engagement and greater well-being. Moreover, a 2015 study found when primed to think about their identities beforehand, multiracial people demonstrated greater creative problem-solving skills.

Americas

United States 

Interracial marriage in the United States has been fully legal in all U.S. states since the 1967 Supreme Court decision that deemed anti-miscegenation state laws unconstitutional (via the 14th Amendment adopted in 1868) with many states choosing to legalize interracial marriage at much earlier dates. Anti-miscegenation laws have played a large role in defining racial identity and enforcing the racial hierarchy. The United States has many ethnic and racial groups, and interracial marriage is fairly common among most of them. Interracial marriages increased from 2% of married couples in 1970 to 7% in 2005 and 8.4% in 2010.

According to a Pew Research Center analysis of census data conducted in 2013, 12% of newlyweds married someone of a different race. (This share does not take into account the "interethnic" marriages between Hispanics and non-Hispanics). And, most Americans say they approve of racial or ethnic intermarriage – not just in the abstract, but in their own families. About six-in-ten say it would be fine with them if a family member told them they were going to marry someone from any major race/ethnic groups other than their own.

Some racial groups are more likely to intermarry than others. Of the 3.6 million adults who got married in 2013, 58% of Native Americans, 28% of Asian Americans, 19% of African-Americans and 7% of White Americans have a spouse whose race was different from their own. The overall numbers mask significant gender gaps within some racial groups. Among black Americans, men are much more likely than women to marry someone of a different race. Fully a quarter of black men who got married in 2013 married someone who was not black. Only 12% of black women married outside of their race. For Asians, the gender pattern goes in the opposite direction: Asian women are much more likely than Asian men to marry someone of a different race. Among newlyweds in 2013, 37% of Asian women married someone who was not Asian, while 16% of Asian men married outside of their race. However, Asian women are more likely to marry Asian men than any other men of different ethnic background. Native Americans have the highest interracial marriage rate among all single-race groups. Women are slightly more likely to "marry out" than men in this group: 61% of Native American female newlyweds married outside their race, compared with 54% of Native American male newlyweds.

Although the anti-miscegenation laws have been revoked by the Warren Court in 1967, the social stigma related to black interracial marriages still exists in today's society although to a much lesser degree. Research by Tucker and Mitchell-Kerman from 1990 has shown that black Americans intermarry far less than any other non-White group and in 2010, only 17.1% of black Americans married interracially, a rate far lower than the rates for Hispanics and Asians. Black interracial marriages in particular engender problems associated with racist attitudes and perceived relational inappropriateness. There is also a sharp gender imbalance to Black interracial marriages: In 2008, 22% of all black male newlyweds married interracially while only 9% of black female newlyweds married outside their race, making them one of the least likely of any race or gender to marry outside their race and the least likely to get married at all.

From the mid 19th to 20th centuries, many black people and ethnic Mexicans intermarried with each other in the Lower Rio Grande Valley in South Texas (mostly in Cameron County and Hidalgo County). In Cameron County, 38% of black people were interracially married (7/18 families) while in Hidalgo County the number was 72% (18/25 families). These two counties had the highest rates of interracial marriages involving at least one black spouse in the United States. The vast majority of these marriages involved black men marrying ethnic Mexican women or first generation Tejanas (Texas-born women of Mexican descent). Since ethnic Mexicans were considered white by Texas officials and the U.S. government, such marriages were a violation of the state's anti-miscegenation laws. Yet, there is no evidence that anyone in South Texas was prosecuted for violating this law. The rates of this interracial marriage dynamic can be traced back to when black men moved into the Lower Rio Grande Valley after the Civil War ended. They married into ethnic Mexican families and joined other black people who found sanctuary on the U.S./Mexico border.

The Chinese that migrated were almost entirely of Cantonese origin. Hundreds of thousands of Chinese men in the U.S., mostly of Cantonese origin from Taishan migrated to the United States. Anti-miscegenation laws in many states prohibited Chinese men from marrying non-Asian women. After the Emancipation Proclamation, many intermarriages in some states were not recorded and historically, Chinese American men married African American women in high proportions to their total marriage numbers due to few Chinese American women being in the United States. After the Emancipation Proclamation, many Chinese Americans immigrated to the Southern states, particularly Arkansas, to work on plantations. For example, in 1880, the tenth US census of Louisiana alone counted 57% of interracial marriages between these Chinese to be with black and 43% to be with white women. Between 20 and 30 percent of the Chinese who lived in Mississippi married black women before 1940. In a genetic study of 199 samples from African American males found one belong to haplogroup O2a ( or 0.5% ) It was discovered by historian Henry Louis Gates, Jr in the African American Lives documentary miniseries that NASA astronaut Mae Jemison has a significant (above 10%) genetic East Asian admixture. Gates speculated that the intermarriage/relations between migrant Chinese workers during the 19th century and black, or African-American slaves or ex-slaves may have contributed to her ethnic genetic make-up. In the mid-1850s, 70 to 150 Chinese were living in New York City and 11 of them married Irish women. In 1906 the New York Times (6 August) reported that 300 white women (Irish American) were married to Chinese men in New York, with many more cohabited. In 1900, based on Liang research, of the 120,000 men in more than 20 Chinese communities in the United States, he estimated that one out of every twenty Chinese men (Cantonese) was married to white women. In the 1960s census showed 3500 Chinese men married to white women and 2900 Chinese women married to white men. It also showed 300 Chinese men married to Black women and vice versa 100.

The 1960 interracial marriage census showed 51,000 black-white coupled. White males and black females being slightly more common (26,000) than black males and white females (25,000) The 1960 census also showed that Interracial marriage involving Asian and Native American was the most common. White women most common intermarriage was with Filipino males (12,000), followed by American Indian males (11,200), followed by Japanese males (3,500) and Chinese males (3,500).  For White males, the most was with Japanese females (21,700), American Indian females (17,500), followed by Filipina females (4,500) and Chinese females (2,900).

Hawaii 
The majority of the Hawaiian Chinese were Cantonese migrants from Guangdong with minority of Hakka descent also from Guangdong. If all people with Chinese ancestry in Hawaii (including the Chinese-Hawaiians) are included, they form about 1/3 of Hawaii's entire population. Many thousands of them married women of Hawaiian, Hawaiian/European and European origin. A large percentage of the Chinese men married Hawaiian and Hawaiian/European women, while a minority married white women in Hawaii who were of Portuguese descent. The 12,592 Asiatic-Hawaiians enumerated in 1930 were the result of Chinese men intermarrying with Hawaiian and part Hawaiian/Europeans. Most Asiatic-Hawaiian men also married Hawaiians and European women (and vice versa). On the census, some Chinese with little "native blood" would be classified as Chinese – not as Asiatic-Hawaiians – due to "dilution of native blood". Intermarriage started to decline in the 1920s.

Portuguese and other Caucasian women married Chinese men. The unions between Chinese men and Portuguese women resulted in children of mixed Chinese Portuguese parentage, called Chinese-Portuguese. For two years to 30 June 1933, 38 of these children who were born were classified as pure Chinese because their fathers were Chinese. A large amount of mingling took place between Chinese and Portuguese, Chinese men married Portuguese, Spanish, Hawaiian, Caucasian-Hawaiian, etc. Only one Chinese man was recorded marrying an American woman. Chinese men in Hawaii also married Puerto Rican, Italian, Japanese, and half-white women.

Canada 
In Canada, 2011, 4.6% of all civil unions are interracial ones, an 18% increase from 2006 (3.9%), and a 77% increase from 1991 (2.6%). Vancouver reported the highest rate of interracial unions, at 9.6%, and Toronto in second place at 8.2%. Major census metropolitan areas had higher frequencies of mixed unions (6.0%) compared to areas that were not classified as such (1.0%). Younger people were more likely to be in a mixed union; the highest proportion of couples in mixed unions was among persons aged 25 to 34 (7.7%), 35 to 44 (6.8%), 15 to 24 (6.1%), 45 to 54 (4.1%), and 55 and over (2.7%).

The 2006 study had an interesting find, that people born in Canada were more likely to marry someone of another race as opposed to those who immigrated there; only 12% of first generation immigrant visible minorities were in a mixed union, this figure is higher for second generation immigrants (51%) and three or more generation immigrants (69%). There are a few examples of this:
 63% of Canadian-born Blacks (who were in couples) were in mixed unions, while the numbers for Blacks born in the Caribbean and Bermuda (17%), and Africa (13%) were much lower percentages.
 For Chinese people born in Canada, 54% (who were in couples) were with someone non-Chinese (it's not noted if this figure refers to anyone who is not East Asian (race), or just not Chinese (nationality)), compared to only 3% of those born in China who immigrated to Canada.
 33% of South Asian Canadians who were born in Canada, were in a mixed union, compared to only 3% of those who were born in South Asia.

One theory for this may include that those who immigrate as adults, may have already found a partner before immigrating to Canada.

Certain visible minority groups had higher rates of being in mixed unions;
 78.7% of Japanese
 64.9% of multiracial people
 48.2% of Latin Americans
 40.2% of Blacks
 29.8% of Filipinos
 25.4% of Arabs / West Asians
 22.5% of Koreans
 21.9% of Southeast Asians (other than Filipinos)
 19.4% of Chinese
 13.0% of South Asians
 52.4% of other groups;

There are no statistics that show data for White Canadians or Indigenous Canadians.

The 2006 study also stated that same-sex couples are about 2.5 times more likely to be in an interracial marriage as opposed to opposite-sex couples, 9.8% of same-sex marriages are interracial. There were some theories as to why; same-sex marriage in Canada become legal in 2005, whereas opposite sex marriage was always legal, and it also mentions that same-sex couples are more likely to be in common-law marriages, and common-law marriages had a higher frequency of mixed unions.

One study done by Reg Bibby found that 92% of Canadians are accepting of interracial marriages.

Latin America 
In Latin America, most of the population are descended from Amerindians, Europeans and Africans. They formed the Mestizo and Mulatto populations that populate the countries in Latin America. Intermarriage and inter-relations occurred on a larger scale than most places in the world. In some countries, Asian immigrants have also intermarried among the groups. About 300,000 Cantonese coolies and migrants (almost all males) from the 19th-20th century and migrants were shipped to Latin America, many had either intermarried or formed sexual relationships with females of different racial origin such as African, Mullato, European, Mestizo etc. An estimated 100,000 Chinese people that came to Peru, only 15 were women, and in Cuba, the census for 1872 aloned recorded only 32 Chinese women as compared to 58,368 Chinese men. Between a total roughly 140,000 Chinese males went to Cuba between 1847 and 1874, with around another 100,000 went to Peru between 1849 and 1874.

Around 20,000 mostly Cantonese and some Hakka coolies migrated to Jamaica, Guyana, Trinidad. Many of them intermarried with Black women and East Indian women. Unlike in Trinidad Tobago and Guyana who were predominantly Cantonese men who intermarried with Black women and Indian women. In Guyana, the Chinese were mostly Cantonese men and who intermarried with the local women. Because almost all of the Chinese indentured immigrants were men, they tended to intermarry with both East Indians and Africans, and thus the Chinese of Guyana did not remain as physically distinct as other groups. Marriage among different Chinese language groups is rare; it is so rare that the any cases of it can be individually named. While intermarriage between Hakka Chinese and Indians hardly occur.

Guyana 
Many Portuguese men intermarried Creole women. Their children easily merged with the other Creole population. Many Chinese men also intermarried or established sexual relationships with Creole women. At the beginning, interracial marriage with Chinese men was not common at first. In the 1870s it was viewed more negatively than Portuguese men marrying Creole women, so that the Chinese population remained mostly racially pure. Chinese men having interracial marriages became increasingly more common. The significant changes in how Creole women began to view Chinese men as desirable partners led to an increase in intermarriage. Due to the scarcity of Chinese women, Kirke in 1897 had observed that Chinese males in Guyana like to either mix with Creole women, and have the prettiest coloured women as concubines. As a result of continued intermixing, 80% of the Chinese-Guyana look scarcely Chinese with only few characteristics facial features of Chinese.

In Guyana, immigrant Chinese men established sexual relations with local Indian and Creole women due to the lack of Chinese women migrating to British Guiana. Creole sexual relationships and marriages with Chinese and Indians was rare. However, more common was Indian women and Chinese men establishing sexual relations with each other and some Chinese men took their Indian wives back with them to China. In Guyana, while marriages between Indian women and black African men is socially shameful to Indians, Chinese-Indian marriages are considered acceptable as reported by Joseph Nevadomsky in 1983. "Chiney-dougla" is the Indian Guyanese term for mixed Chinese-Indian children. Some Indian women in Guiana had multiple partners due to the greater number of men than women, an account of the era told by women in British Guiana is of a single Chinese man who was allowed to temporarily borrow a Hindu Indian woman by her Indian husband who was his friend, so the Chinese man could sire a child with her, after a son was born to her the Chinese man kept the boy while she was returned to her Indian husband, the boy was named William Adrian Lee. An Indian woman named Mary See married a Chinese man surnamed Wu in Goedverwagting and founded their own family after he learned how to process sugar cane.

In British Guiana, the Chinese did not maintain their distinctive physical features due to the high rate of Chinese men marrying people other ethnicities like Indian women. The severe imbalance with Indian men outnumbering Indian women led some women to take advantage of the situation to squeeze favors from men and leave their partners for other men, one infamous example was a pretty, light skinned, Christian Indian woman named Mary Ilandun with ancestral origins from Madras, born in 1846, who had sex with Indian, black, and Chinese men as she married them in succession and ran off with their money to her next paramour, doing this from 1868 to 1884. Indian men used force to bring Indian women back in line from this kind of behavior. The most severe lack of women in all the peoples of British Guiana was with the Chinese and this led Europeans to believe that Chinese did not engage in wife murders while wife murders was something innate to Indian men, and unlike Indian coolie women, Chinese women were viewed as chaste. Chinese women were not indentured and since they did not need to work, they avoided prospective men seeking relationships, while the character of Indian women was disparaged as immoral and their alleged sexual looseness was blamed for their deaths in the "wife murders" by Indian men. The sex ratio of Indian men to Indian women was 100:63 while the sex ratio of Chinese men to Chinese women was 100:43 in British Guiana in 1891.

Over time, although there were more Creole marriages with Chinese, there was also small growth of Indian marriages with Chinese and it was reported that "It is not an uncommon thing to find a cooly woman living with a Chinaman as his wife, and in one or two instances the woman has accompanied her reputed husband to China." by Dr. Comins in 1891, with six Indian women marrying Chinese men in just the year of 1892 alone, as reported by The Immigration Report for 1892.

Trinidad 

According to the 1931 census, 1,713 persons were born to Indian fathers only, and 805 were born to Indian mothers only (Kuczynski 1953). The race of the other parent is not indicated. The 1946 census registers the presence of 8,406 East Indian Creoles who are defined as "persons of mixed East Indian origin, on the whole people who had an East Indian father or an East Indian mother only" (Kuczynski 339). Harewood (1975) notes that these 8,406 were included in the category "Mixed" together with 70,369 mulattoes and other people of mixed racial ancestry.

In Trinidad some Chinese men had sexual relations Indian coolie women, siring children with them, and it was reported that "A few children are to be met with born of Madras and Creole parents and some also of Madras and Chinese parents – the Madrasee being the mother", by the missionary John Morton in 1876, Morton noted that it seemed strange since there were more Indian coolie men than Indian coolie women that Indian coolie women would marry Chinese men, but claimed it was most likely because the Chinese could provide amenities to the women since the Chinese owned shops and they were enticed by these. Indian women were married by indentured Chinese men in Trinidad. Few Chinese women migrated to Trinidad while the majority of Chinese migrants were men. The migration of Chinese to Trinidad resulted in intermarriage between them and others. Chinese in Trinidad became relatively open to having marital relations with other races and Indian women began having families with Chinese in the 1890s.

The situation in Trinidad and British Guiana with Indian women being fewer than Indian men led to Indian women using the situation to their advantage by leaving their partners for other men, leading to a high incidence of "wife murders" by Indian men on their wives, and Indian women and culture were branded as "immoral" by European observers, an Indian man named Mohammad Orfy petitioned as a representative of "destitute Indian men of Trinidad", to the colonial authorities, complaining of Indian women's behavior and claiming that it was "a perforating plague...the high percentage of immoral lives led by the female section of our community...to satisfy the greed and lust of the male section of quite a different race to theirs...[Indian women] are enticed, seduced and frightened into becoming concubines, and paramours...[Indian women] have absolutely no knowledge whatsoever of the value of being in virginhood...most shameless and a perfect menace to the Indian gentry." with him naming specific peoples, claiming that Indian women were having sex with Chinese men, Americans, Africans, and Europeans, saying "Africans, Americans and Chinese in goodly numbers are enticing the females of India, who are more or less subtle to lustful traps augured through some fear of punishment being meted out if not readily submissive as requested."

The situation on Trinidad enabled unprecedented autonomy in the sexual activities of Indian women and freedom. The 1916 "Peition of Indentured Labourers in Trinidad" complained that: "Is it permissible for a male member of the Christian faith to keep a Hindoo or Muslim female as his paramour or concubine? Is this not an act of sacrilege and a disgraceful scandal according to the Christian faith to entice and encourage Indian females to lead immoral lives?" Indian men used violence against Indian women in response to Indian women engaging in sexual relations with multiple men due to the shortage of them in Trinidad. On plantations white European managers took advantage of and use indentured Indian woman for sex, in addition, English, Portuguese, and Chinese men were also in sexual relationships with Indian women as noted by Attorney General W.F. Haynes Smith, while Creole women were abhorred or ignored by Indian men. Approval of interracial marriage has slowly increased in Trinidad and Tobago and one Chinese man reported that his Indian wife did not encounter any rejection from his parents when asked in a survey. In Trinidad Europeans and Chinese are seen as acceptable marriage partners by Indians while marrying black men would lead to rejection of their daughters by Indian families.

In British Guiana and Trinidad, white overseers and managers would take advantage of Indian coolie women and use them in sexual relationships, the Indian women were then blamed for these incidents and viewed as allegedly "loose" and promiscuous by colonial officials, and Indian women were subjected to a high rate of "wife murders" by Indian men, the Indian women were also blamed for this due to their "inconstancy" due to alleged low "sexual morality". In one incident in Trinidad, seven Indian women were impregnated at the same time by an estate manager in 1854. The managers sexual relations with Indian women caused riots, at the most significant one, at the hands of the police, 59 Indians were wounded and 5 Indians were killed, in Non Pareil in 1896, due to an Indian woman cohabiting with Gerad Van Nooten, the acting manager. The low ratio of Indian women compared to Indian men, along with the factor of Portuguese, white overseers and managers, and Chinese men having sexual relations with Indian women, aggravated the problem of rivalry for Indian women between Indian men, and drove up the value of Indian women. The incidents of overseers and managers taking sexual advantage of the women laborers led to Indian laborers causing stoppages and protests. In British Guiana the overseers and managers sexual abuse of Indian women caused Indian workers to embark on a "struggle" from 1869 to 1872. Conflicts due to women led to attacks against drivers and overseers. The resentment of the workers was aggravated by the use of women on estates for sexual relations.

The deficit in Indian women compared to men was caused by the recruitment quota ratio of 100 men to 40 women, most of the women were young and single, and the shortage of Indian women for Indian men was aggravated when Indian women were taken by Africans and European overseers, leading to high amounts of wife murders against Indian women by Indian men and a decrease in morals. The appropriation of Indian women by Europeans and Africans added up to the resentment which contributed to violence against Indian women by Indian men. Indian women on plantations took part in the struggle against Africans and European authorities who were sexually using them. Indian nationalists ashamed of the sexual reputation of Indian coolie women often attacked the coolie trade for that reason instead of other reasons such as bad working conditions. Overseers and planters on the plantations and sailors and doctors on board the ships transporting Indian coolie women would try to obtain sex from Indian women. The Indian women had a sexual bargaining chip since they could frequently change lovers due to the fact that there were less Indian women than men, The Daily Chronicle described Indian coolie women as "pretty and youthful", laborers had to be moved around plantations by managers to prevent men from killing their adulterous wives, and the aura surrounding the sexuality and perils of Indian coolie women was enhanced by the widespread worship of the goddess Kali by them. Riots and murders were blamed on the sexual liaisons between white overseers, managers and Indian coolie women in addition to their constant changing of sexual partners and the sexuality of coolie women were viewed shamefully as a deviation of the expected behavior of Indian women. The Guyanese-Indian journalist Gaiutra Bahadur wrote about the experiences of Indian coolie women. Sex was utilized as a potent instrument by Indian coolie women such as when they obtained favors from overseers by having sex with them, and the women could either have been "imperiled" or "empowered" when forming sexual relations with overseers. The Indian coolie women both had sexual advantages due to being less in number and suffered from sexual exploitation, in total, around 250,000 Indian women migrated as coolies.

Gaiutra Bahadur said in an interview that some Guyanese from her community were angered by her book and writing on the sexual experiences of the Indian coolie woman, with one saying "Who is that woman who's been writing that all of our grandmothers and great-grandmothers were prostitutes?", and another saying "One must be careful." to her, viewing her book as an attack on the honor and morals of Indian women, Bahadur maintained that she was trying to bring back the "dignity" of the women and that Indian women's honor was attacked in the same way by colonial officials who blamed the women themselves for their sexual liaisons rather than flaws in the plantation and indenture systems.

A stereotype of an uncontrollable sexual libido was attributed to Indian women in the Caribbean and they were described as having "white liver" because of this. Sexual abuse, poor living standards, and tough work were all things Indian coolie women had to contend with. In seeking potential mates the Indian coolie women has some amount of free choice due to their scarce numbers, some of them were able to end their indenture when married by white overseers. There were cases of sexual abuse of Indian women on the ships and one man prostituted his 8-year-old daughter, and in another case a British surgeon married a young widow, the women obtained an advantage in sexual relations from being less numerous than men but this led to a large amount of killings called "wife murders" of the women by men they rejected. Postcards were made of Indian coolie women and girls bedecked in jewelry made of gold and silver such as bangles and nose rings which seemed to be aiming to show them as wealthy and pretty. Indian coolie women wore their wealth in the form of jewellery, like bangles and nose rings. In Port of Spain in Trinidad, Chinese coolies were described as going about almost naked while Indian coolie women wore "scanty drapery" and had "arms and ankles covered with bangles". One Indian woman on the way to Guiana had to be given jewelry like bangles made of silver and nose rings made of gold to by her husband in order to make her not leave him.

Peru 
Interracial marriages between Cantonese-Chinese males and Peruvian females was quite large resulting in large number of mixed children's and people with some Chinese ancestry in Peru. There is no prevailing racist attitude against intermarriage between the Chinese and non-Chinese in Peru, so the number of interracial marriages is quite large. According to one source, the number of mix raced children born was 180,000. Half of that number was in Lima alone, with the ratio between Chinese mestizo and the full-blooded Chinese at 90,000 to 15,000 (6:1). There is estimated up to 2.5 million (up to 8% of Peru) citizens are of mixed Chinese-Peruvian ancestry known as 'Tusans'. One estimates puts 4.2 million (15%) of the Peruvians having some Chinese ancestry.

Many Peruvian women of different origins married to these Chinese male migrants. Most of the women that married Chinese are Native Indians (including Meztiza) and Black. Some lower class white women also married Chinese men but in a lower ratio.  Chinese had contact with Peruvian women in cities, there they formed relationships and sired mixed babies, these women originated from Andean and coastal areas and did not originally come from the cities, in the haciendas on the coast in rural areas, native young women of indígenas (native) and serranas (mountain) origin from the Andes mountains would come down to work, these Andean native women were favored as marital partners by Chinese men over Africans, with matchmakers arranging for communal marriages of Chinese men to indígenas and serranas young women. There was a racist reaction by Peruvians to the marriages of Peruvian women and Chinese men. When native Peruvian women (cholas et natives, Indias, indígenas) and Chinese men had mixed children, the children were called injerto and once these injertos emerged, Chinese men then sought out girls of injertas origins as marriage partners, children born to black mothers were not called injertos. Low class Peurvians established sexual unions or marriages with the Chinese men and some black and Indian women "bred" with the Chinese according to Alfredo Sachettí, who claimed the mixing was causing the Chinese to suffer from "progressive degeneration", in Casa Grande highland Indian women and Chinese men participated in communal "mass marriages" with each other, arranged when highland women were brought by a Chinese matchmaker after receiving a down payment.

It was reported by the New York Times that Peruvian black and Indian (Native) women married Chinese men to their own advantage and to the disadvantage of the men since they dominated and "subjugated" the Chinese men despite the fact that the labor contract was annulled by the marriage, reversing the roles in marriage with the Peruvian woman holding marital power, ruling the family and making the Chinese men slavish, docile, "servile", "submissive" and "feminine" and commanding them around, reporting that "Now and then...he [the Chinese man] becomes enamored of the charms of some sombre-hued chola (Native Indian and mestiza woman) or samba (mixed black woman), and is converted and joins the Church, so that may enter the bonds of wedlock with the dusky señorita." Chinese men were sought out as husbands and considered a "catch" by the "dusky damsels" (Peruvian women) because they were viewed as a "model husband, hard-working, affectionate, faithful and obedient" and "handy to have in the house", the Peruvian women became the "better half" instead of the "weaker vessel" and would command their Chinese husbands "around in fine style" instead of treating them equally, while the labor contract of the Chinese coolie would be nullified by the marriage, the Peruvian wife viewed the nullification merely as the previous "master" handing over authority over the Chinese man to her as she became his "mistress", keeping him in "servitude" to her, speedily ending any complaints and suppositions by the Chinese men that they would have any power in the marriage.

Cuba 

120,000 Cantonese labourers (all males) entered Cuba under contract for 80 years, most did not marry, but Hung Hui (1975) cites there was frequent sexual activity between black women and Cantonese coolies. According to Osberg (1965) the free Chinese conducted the practice of buying slave women and freeing them expressly for marriage. In the nineteenth and twentieth centuries, Chinese men (Cantonese) engaged in sexual activity with white Cuban women and black Cuban women, and from such relations many children were born. In the 1920s, an additional 30,000 Cantonese and small groups of Japanese also arrived; both immigrations were exclusively male, and there was rapid intermarriage with white, black, and mulato populations.

In the study of Genetic origin, admixture, and asymmetry in maternal and paternal human lineages in Cuba. Thirty-five Y-chromosome SNPs were typed in the 132 male individuals of the Cuban sample. The study does not include any people with some Chinese ancestry. All the samples were White Cubans and Black Cubans. 2 out of 132 male sample belong to East Asian Haplogroup O2 which is found in significant frequencies among Cantonese people is found in 1.5% of Cuban population.

Mexico 

The Chinese who migrated to Mexico in the 19th to 20th centuries were almost entirely Chinese men. Males made up the majority of the original Chinese community in Mexico and they married Mexican women. They married Mexican women, which led to anti-Chinese prejudice; many were expelled, while those who were allowed to stay intermarried with the Mexican population. The Mexicali officials estimate was that slightly more than 2,000 are full-blooded Chinese and about 8,000 are mixed-blood Chinese-Mexicans. Other estimates claimed 50,000 residents more than thought who are of Chinese descent. 10,000 full-blooded Chinese, down from 35,000 in the 1920s. Marriage of these people to full-blooded Mexicans is diluting the community further. Chinese Mexicans in Mexicali consider themselves equally "cachanilla", a term used for locals, as any other resident of the city, even if they speak Cantonese in addition to Spanish. The sentiment against Chinese men was due to (and almost all Chinese immigrants in Mexico were men) stealing employment and Mexican women from Mexican men who had gone off to fight in the Revolution or in World War I.

Costa Rica 

The Chinese originated from the Cantonese male migrants. Pure Chinese make up only 1% of the Costa Rican population, but according to Jacqueline M. Newman, as close to 10% of the people in Costa Rica are Chinese, if we count the people who are Chinese, married to a Chinese person, or of mixed Chinese descent. Most Chinese immigrants since then have been Cantonese, but in the last decades of the 20th century, a number of immigrants have also come from Taiwan. Many men came alone to work and married Costa Rican women and speak Cantonese. However the majority of the descendants of the first Chinese immigrants no longer speak Cantonese and feel themselves to be Costa Ricans. They married Tican women (a blend of Europeans, Caztizos, Mestizos, Indian, and Black). A Tican is also a White person with a small portion of non-white blood like Caztizos. The census of 1989 shows about 98% of Costa Ricans were either white, Castizos or Mestizos, with 80% being white or Caztizos.

Venezuela 

Marriages between European, Mestizo, Amerindians, and Africans was not uncommon in the past. Several thousand Chinese from Enping resided in the country. The Chinese were still largely viewed as a foreign population who married foreign brides but seldom integrated into Venezuelan society.

Jamaica 

When black and Indian women had children with Chinese men the children were called chaina raial in Jamaican English. The Chinese community in Jamaica was able to consolidate because an openness to marrying Indian women was present in the Chinese since Chinese women were in short supply. Women sharing was less common among Indians in Jamaica according to Verene A. Shepherd. The small number of Indian women were fought over between Indian men and led to a rise in the amount of wife murders by Indian men. Indian women made up 11 percent of the annual amount of Indian indentured migrants from 1845 to 1847 in Jamaica. Thousands of Chinese men (mostly Hakka) and Indian men married local Jamaican women. The study "Y-chromosomal diversity in Haiti and Jamaica: Contrasting levels of sex-biased gene flow" shows the paternal Chinese haplogroup O-M175 at a frequency of 3.8% in local Jamaicans ( non-Chinese Jamaicans) including the Indian H-M69 (0.6%) and L-M20 (0.6%) in local Jamaicans. Among the country's most notable Afro-Asians are reggae singers Sean Paul, Tami Chynn and Diana King.

Africa and Middle East

Middle East and North Africa 

Interracial marriage was common in the Arab world during the Arab slave trade, which lasted throughout the Middle Ages and early modern period. Most of these enslaved peoples came from places such as Sub-Saharan Africa (mainly Zanj) the North Caucasus, Central Asia (mainly Tatars), and Western, Southern and Southeastern Europe (mainly Slavs from Serbia – Saqaliba, Spain, France, Italy). The Barbary pirates from North Africa captured and enslaved 1.25 million slaves from Western Europe and North America between the 16th and 19th centuries. Outside the Arab world, it was also common for Arab conquerors, traders and explorers to intermarry with local females in the lands they conquered or traded with, in various different parts of Africa, Asia (see Asia section) and Europe (see Europe section).

From AD 839, Viking Varangian mercenaries who were in the service of the Byzantine Empire, notably Harald Sigurdsson, campaigned in North Africa, Jerusalem and other places in the Middle East during the Byzantine-Arab Wars. They interbred with the local population as spoils of warfare or through eventual settling with many Scandinavian Viking men taking Syrian or Anatolian women as wives. There is archaeological evidence the Vikings had established contact with the city of Baghdad, at the time the center of the Islamic Empire, and connected with the populace there. Regularly plying the Volga with their trade goods (furs, tusks, seal fat, seal boats and notably female slaves; the one period in the history of the slave-trade when females were priced higher than males), the Vikings were active in the Arab slave trade at the time. These slaves, most often Europeans that were captured from the coasts of Europe or during war periods, and sold to Arabic traders in Al-Andalus and the Emirate of Sicily.

Intermarriage was accepted in Arab society, though only if the husband was Muslim. It was a fairly common theme in medieval Arabic literature and Persian literature. For example, the Persian poet Nizami, who married his Central Asian Kipchak slave girl, wrote The Seven Beauties (1196). Its frame story involves a Persian prince marrying seven foreign princesses, who are Byzantine, Chinese, Indian, Khwarezmian, Maghrebian, Slavic and Tartar. Hadith Bayad wa Riyad, a 12th-century Arabic tale from Al-Andalus, was a love story involving an Iberian girl and a Damascene man. The Arabian Nights tale of "The Ebony Horse" involves the Prince of Persia, Qamar al-Aqmar, rescuing his lover, the Princess of Sana'a, from the Byzantine Emperor who also wishes to marry her.

At times, some marriages would have a major impact on the politics of the region. The most notable example was the marriage of As-Salih Ayyub, the Sultan of the Kurdish Ayyubid dynasty, to Shajar al-Durr, a slave of Turkic origin from Central Asia. Following her husband's death, she became the Sultana of Egypt and the first Mamluk ruler. Her reign marked the end of the Ayyubid dynasty and the beginning of the Mameluk era, when a series of former Mamluk slaves would rule over Egypt and occasionally other neighbouring regions.

Elsewhere in Africa 

Africa has a long history of interracial mixing with Arabs and later Europeans having sexual relations with black Africans. Arabs played a big role in the African slave trade and unlike the trans-Atlantic trade most of the enslaved Africans in the Arab slave trade were women. Most of them were used as sexual slaves by the Arab men and some were taken as wives.

In the former Lusophone Africa (now known as Angola, Mozambique and Cape Verde) racial mixing between white Portuguese and black Africans was fairly common, especially in Cape Verde, where the majority of the population is of mixed descent.

There have been several cases of Chinese merchants and laborers marrying black African women as many Chinese workers were employed to build railways and other infrastructural projects in Africa. These labour groups were made up completely of men with very few Chinese women coming to Africa. In Réunion and Madagascar, intermarriage between Chinese men of Cantonese origin and African women is not uncommon.

Southern Africa 
There is a significant mixed race population, the result of mostly European and African unions, in South Africa, called Coloureds. The term Coloured is also used to describe persons of mixed race in the neighbouring nation of Namibia, to refer to those of part Khoisan, part black and part white descent. The Basters constitute a separate ethnic group that are sometimes considered a sub-group of the Coloured population of the country.

Some of the Xhosa people claim descent from white people. The royal family of the ImiDushane, for example, is descended from Queen Gquma of the Mpondo, a white orphan that was adopted by a Xhosa chief after a shipwreck killed her parents. She later married an Mpondo prince, became his great wife, and served as queen during his reign as king of the Tshomane Mpondo.

Interracial marriage was banned under apartheid. Due to this, there was considerable opposition to the marriage between Sir Seretse Khama, Paramount Chief of the Bamangwato Tswanas, and his eventual wife Ruth Williams Khama, Lady Khama, even though Chief Khama was Motswana and not South African.

Today there are a number of high-profile interracial couples in Southern Africa, such as the unions of Mmusi Maimane (a black opposition politician who served as the Leader of the Opposition of South Africa) and his white wife Natalie Maimane, Siya Kolisi (a black rugby union player and current captain of the South African national team) and his white wife Rachel Kolisi, Nyaniso Dzedze (a black actor) and his German wife Yana Fay Dzedze, Matthew Booth (a white soccer player) and his wife Sonia Bonneventia (a black former Miss South Africa first princess and international model) and Bryan Habana (a coloured South African rugby union player) and his white wife Janine Viljoen.

Mauritius 
In the late 19th to early 20th century, Chinese men in Mauritius married Indian women due to both a lack of Chinese women and the higher numbers of Indian women on the island. All the immigrants were men. When the very first Chinese arrived in Mauritius, they were reluctant to marry local women. But with no Chinese women in sight, the Chinese men had no choice but to begin to integrate themselves and mix with the Creole and Indian populations on the island and establish households en ménage. The 1921 census in Mauritius counted that Indian women there had a total of 148 children sired by Chinese men. These Chinese were mostly traders. Colonialist stereotypes in the sugar colonies of Indians emerged such as "the degraded coolie woman" and the "coolie wife beater", due to Indian women being murdered by their husbands after they ran away to other richer men since the ratio of Indian women to men was low.

Réunion

The Native Kaf population has a diverse range of ancestry stemming from colonial Indian and Chinese peoples. They also descend from African slaves brought from countries like Mozambique, Guinea, Senegal, Madagascar, Tanzania and Zambia to the island.

Most population of Réunion Creoles who are of mixed ancestry and make up the majority of the population. Interracial marriages between European men and Chinese men with African women, Indian women, Chinese women, Madagascar women were also common. In 2005, a genetic study on the racially mixed people of Réunion found the following. For maternal (mitochondrial) DNA, the haplogroups are Indian (44%), East Asian (27%), European/Middle Eastern (19%) or African (10%). The Indian lineages are M2, M6 and U2i, the East Asian ones are E1, D5a, M7c, and F (E1 and M7c also found only in South East Asia and in Madagascar), the European/Middle Eastern ones are U2e, T1, J, H, and I, and the African ones are L1b1, L2a1, L3b, and L3e1.

For paternal (Y-chromosome) DNA, the haplogroups are European/Middle Eastern (85%) or East Asian (15%). The European lineages are R1b and I, the Middle Eastern one E1b1b1c (formerly E3b3) (also found in Northeast Africa), and the East Asian ones are R1a (found in many parts of the world including Europe and Central and Southern Asia but the particular sequence has been found in Asia) and O3.

West Africa 
In West Africa, a series of interracial marriages and relationships created a number of mixed race families in the various countries of the region.

In Sierra Leone, marriages between representatives of British trading firms and princesses of the Sherbro people created a number of aristocratic families such as the Sherbro Tuckers and the Sherbro Caulkers. Due to matrilineality, they have maintained their claims to their ancestral thrones.

In Benin, meanwhile, the descendants of the Brazilian slave trader Francisco Felix de Sousa and his harem of black consorts have contributed a number of prominent citizens. Figures such as a president (Paul-Emile de Souza) and a first lady (Chantal de Souza Boni Yayi, President de Souza's niece) are arguably the most notable of them.

In Ghana, a number of founding fathers had relationships with foreigners of other races: Kwame Nkrumah married the Egyptian Copt Fathia Nkrumah and raised a family with her. Their children would go on to become politicians like their father. President Nkrumah's contemporary and sometime friend, Joe Appiah, was himself married to the British debutante Peggy Cripps Appiah. At the start of the 21st century, their descendants were being led by their only son, Kwame Anthony Appiah. In addition to this, Dr. J. B. Danquah had a son with a British woman during his time in Britain. He would go on to become noted actor Paul Danquah.

In Gabon, a woman by the name of Germaine Anina - daughter of a Gabonese tribal chief - married a Chinese trader and politician named Cheng Zhiping. Their son, Jean Ping, went on to serve as a minister in his mother's native country.

In orthodox Serer religion and custom, interfaith and interracial marriages are forbidden. Banishment and disinheritance may be levied against a Serer who fails to follow these customary teachings. The Serer-Noon (a sub-group of the Serer people) strongly adhere to these teachings. It was for this reason that the first Senegalese president Léopold Sédar Senghor did not receive support from the Serer community, especially the ultra—traditional Serer. Although born to an aristocratic Serer family, he did not receive support from the Serer community due to his marriage to his French wife (see below). Instead, he was supported by other ethnic groups such as the Wolof and Fula. In return, Senghor failed to develop Serer villages and towns.

Lastly, a number of the first ladies in Francophone West Africa have been French: Collette Hubert Senghor and Viviane Wade of Senegal, and Dominique Ouattara of Ivory Coast.

Oceania

Australia 

Historical marriages of Aboriginal Australian women with European men and Asian men of various nationality have been recorded in the late 19th and 20th century. Chinese immigrant men and other Asian men migrated to Australia and intermarried with Aboriginal Australian women. In 1913, anthropologist and temporary Chief Protector Walter Baldwin Spencer opposed these intermarriages and demonstrated clear bias against the mixing of Aboriginal women and Asian men (as opposed to white men), claiming their sexual contact caused 'rapid degeneration of the native'.

Most of the early Chinese-Australian population was formed by Cantonese migrants from Guangzhou and Taishan, including some from Fujian, who came during the goldrush period of the 1850s. Marriage records show that between the 1850s and around the start of the 20th century, there were about 2,000 legal marriages between white women and migrant Chinese men in Australia's eastern colonies, probably with similar numbers involved in de facto relationships of various kinds. Rallies against Chinese men taking white women became widespread. In late 1878 there were 181 marriages between European women and ethnic Chinese men, and 171 couples cohabiting without matrimony, resulting in 586 children.

No data about the races of people getting married in Australia is currently collected, meaning no figures can be produced on interracial marriages.

Asia

Central Asia 
Today Central Asians are a mixture of various peoples, such as Mongols, Turks, and Iranians. The Mongol conquest of Central Asia in the 13th century resulted in the mass killings of the Iranian-speaking people and Indo-Europeans population of the region, their culture and languages being superseded by that of the Mongolian-Turkic peoples. The invasions of Bukhara, Samarkand, Urgench and others resulted in mass murders and unprecedented destruction, such as portions of Khwarezmia being completely razed. The remaining surviving population were either displaced or assimilated with intermarriage with invaders. Genetic studies indicates all Central Asian ethnicities share a various genetic mixture of East Eurasian and West Eurasian.

Interracial marriage between Turkic, European, Central Asians in Kazakhstan are rare but increasing. The most common marriages are between Kazakh and Volga Tatars. Intermarriage usually involves Kazakh men, due to Muslim tradition favouring male over female. For example, 1% were between Russians, Tatars, and Kazakhs (792 between Russians and Tatars, 561 between Kazakhs and Tatars, and 212 between Kazakhs and Russians). 701 Kazakh men married Russians or Tatars, against only 72 Kazakh women. Among Kirgiz men living in Uzbekistan and married to non-Kirgiz women, 9.6% had married Russians, 25.6% Uzbeks, and 34.3% Tatars. Among Kazakh men in Uzbekistan, the structure of mixed marriages appeared as follows: 4.4% married Russians.

Afghanistan 
Genetic analysis of the Hazara people indicates partial Mongolian ancestry. Invading Mongols and Turco-Mongols intermixed with the local Iranian population, forming a distinct group. Mongols settled in what is now Afghanistan and intermarried with native populations who spoke Persian. A second wave of mostly Chagatai Mongols came from Central Asia and were followed by other Mongolic groups, associated with the Ilkhanate and the Timurids, all of whom settled in Hazarajat and mixed with the local, mostly Persian-speaking population, forming a distinct group. One genetic study detected Sub-Saharan African lineages in both the paternal and maternal ancestry of Hazara. Among the Hazaras there are 7.5% of African mtDNA haplogroup L with 5.1% of African Y-DNA B. The origin and date of when these admixture occurred are unknown but was believed to have been during the slave trades in Afghanistan.

East Asia

China

Western regions 
Intermarriage was initially discouraged by the Tang dynasty. In 836 Lu Chun was appointed as governor of Canton, and was disgusted to find the Chinese living with foreigners and intermarrying. Lu enforced separation, banned interracial marriages, and made it illegal for foreigners to own property. Lu Chun believed his principles were just and upright. The 836 law specifically banned Chinese from forming relationships with "dark peoples" or "people of colour", which was used to describe foreigners, such as "Iranians, Sogdians, Arabs, Indians, Malays, Sumatrans", among others.

In 779, the Tang dynasty issued an edict which forced Uighurs to wear their ethnic dress, stopped them from marrying Chinese females, and banned them from pretending to be Chinese. The magistrate who issued the orders may have wanted to protect "purity" in Chinese custom.
Han men also married Turkic Uyghur women in Xinjiang from 1880 to 1949. Sometimes poverty influenced Uyghur women to marry Han men. These marriages were not recognized by local mullahs since Muslim women were not allowed to marry non-Muslim men under Islamic law. This did not stop the women because they enjoyed advantages: they were not subject to Islamic law and not subjected to certain taxes. Uyghur women married to Han men also did not have to wear a veil, and they received their husband's property upon his death. These women were forbidden from having burial in Muslim graves. The children of Han men and Uyghur women were considered to be Uyghur. Some Han soldiers had Uyghur women as temporary wives, and after their service was up, the wife was left behind or sold. If it was possible, sons were taken, and daughters were sold.

Iranian women dancers were in demand in China during this period. During the Sui dynasty, ten young dancers were sent from Persia to China. During the Tang dynasty, bars were often attended by Iranian or Sogdian waitresses who performed dances for clients. During the Five Dynasties and Ten Kingdoms period (Wudai) (907–960), there are examples of Persian women marrying Chinese emperors. Some Chinese officials from the Song dynasty era also married women from Dashi (Arabia). From the tenth to twelfth century, Persian women were to be found in Guangzhou (Canton), some of them in the tenth century like Mei Zhu in the harem of the Emperor Liu Chang, and in the twelfth century large numbers of Persian women lived there, noted for wearing multiple earrings and "quarrelsome dispositions".
Some scholars did not differentiate between Persian and Arab, and some say that the Chinese called all women coming from the Persian Gulf "Persian women". Genetic evidence shows Persian women intermarried with the Cantonese men of Guangzhou. Yao Yonggang et al. reported that Kivisild detected one W mtDNA out of 69 Guangzhou Cantonese population, a common Middle Eastern and Iranian marker.

By the 14th century, the total population of Muslims in China had grown to 4 million. After Mongol rule had been overthrown by the Ming dynasty in 1368, this led to a violent Chinese backlash against West and Central Asians. In order to contain the violence, both Mongol and Central Asian Semu Muslim women and men of both sexes were required by Ming Code to marry Han Chinese after the first Ming Emperor Hongwu passed the law in Article 122. Han women who married Hui men became Hui, and Han men who married Hui women also became Hui.

Of the Han Chinese Li family in Quanzhou, Li Nu, the son of Li Lu, visited Hormuz in Persia in 1376, married a Persian or an Arab woman, and brought her back to Quanzhou. He then converted to Islam. Li Nu was the ancestor of the Ming dynasty reformer Li Chih.

After the Oghuz Turkmen Salars moved from Samarkand in Central Asia to Xunhua, Qinghai in the early Ming dynasty, they converted Tibetan women to Islam and the Tibetan women were taken as wives by Salar men. A Salar wedding ritual where grains and milk were scattered on a horse by the bride was influenced by Tibetans. After they moved into northern Tibet, the Salars originally practiced the same Gedimu (Gedem) variant of Sunni Islam as the Hui people and adopted Hui practices like using the Hui Jingtang Jiaoyu Islamic education during the Ming dynasty which derived from Yuan dynasty Arabic and Persian primers. One of the Salar primers was called "Book of Diverse Studies" (雜學本本 Zaxue Benben) in Chinese. The version of Sunni Islam practiced by Salars was greatly impacted by Salars marrying with Hui who had settled in Xunhua. The Hui introduced new Naqshbandi Sufi orders like Jahriyya and Khafiyya to the Salars and eventually these Sufi orders led to sectarian violence involving Qing soldiers (Han, Tibetans and Mongols) and the Sufis which included the Chinese Muslims (Salars and Hui). Ma Laichi brought the Khafiyya Naqshbandi order to the Salars and the Salars followed the Flowered mosque order (花寺門宦) of the Khafiyya. He preached silent dhikr and simplified Qur'an readings bringing the Arabic text Mingsha jing (明沙經, 明沙勒, 明沙爾 Minshar jing) to China.

The Kargan Tibetans, who live next to the Salar, have mostly become Muslim due to the Salars. The Salar oral tradition recalls that it was around 1370 in which they came from Samarkand to China. The later Qing dynasty and Republic of China Salar General Han Youwen was born to a Tibetan woman named Ziliha (孜力哈) and a Salar father named Aema (阿额玛).

Tibetan women were the original wives of the first Salars to arrive in the region as recorded in Salar oral history. The Tibetans agreed to let their Tibetan women marry Salar men after putting up several demands to accommodate cultural and religious differences. Hui and Salar intermarry due to cultural similarities and following the same Islamic religion. Older Salars married Tibetan women but younger Salars prefer marrying other Salars. Han and Salar mostly do not intermarry with each other unlike marriages of Tibetan women to Salar men. Salars however use Han surnames. Salar patrilineal clans are much more limited than Han patrilinial clans in how much they deal with culture, society or religion. Salar men often marry a lot of non-Salar women and they took Tibetan women as wives after migrating to Xunhua according to historical accounts and folk histories. Salars almost exclusively took non-Salar women as wives like Tibetan women while never giving Salar women to non-Salar men in marriage except for Hui men who were allowed to marry Salar women. As a result, Salars are heavily mixed with other ethnicities.

Salars in Qinghai live on both banks of the Yellow river, south and north, the northern ones are called Hualong or Bayan Salars while the southern ones are called Xunhua Salars. The region north of the Yellow river is a mix of discontinuous Salar and Tibetan villages while the region south of the yellow river is solidly Salar with no gaps in between, since Hui and Salars pushed the Tibetans on the south region out earlier. Tibetan women who converted to Islam were taken as wives on both banks of the river by Salar men. The term for maternal uncle (ajiu) is used for Tibetans by Salars since the Salars have maternal Tibetan ancestry. Tibetans witness Salar life passages in Kewa, a Salar village and Tibetan butter tea is consumed by Salars there as well. Other Tibetan cultural influences like Salar houses having four corners with a white stone on them became part of Salar culture as long as they were not prohibited by Islam. Hui people started assimilating and intermarrying with Salars in Xunhua after migrating there from Hezhou in Gansu due to the Chinese Ming dynasty ruling the Xunhua Salars after 1370 and Hezhou officials governed Xunhua. Many Salars with the Ma surname appear to be of Hui descent since a lot of Salars now have the Ma surname while in the beginning the majority of Salars had the Han surname. Some example of Hezhou Hui who became Salars are the Chenjia (Chen family) and Majia (Ma family) villages in Altiuli where the Chen and Ma families are Salars who admit their Hui ancestry. Marriage ceremonies, funerals, birth rites and prayer were shared by both Salar and Hui as they intermarriaed and shared the same religion since more and more Hui moved into the Salar areas on both banks of the Yellow river. Many Hui married Salars and eventually it became far more popular for Hui and Salar to intermarry due to both being Muslims than to non-Muslim Han, Mongols and Tibetans. The Salar language and culture however was highly impacted in the 14th-16th centuries in their original ethnogenesis by marriage with Mongol and Tibetan non-Muslims with many loanwords and grammatical influence by Mongol and Tibetan in their language. Salars were multilingual in Salar and Mongol and then in Chinese and Tibetan as they trade extensively in the Ming, Qing and Republic of China periods on the yellow river in Ningxia and Lanzhou in Gansu.

Salars and Tibetans both use the term maternal uncle (ajiu in Salar and Chinese, azhang in Tibetan) to refer to each other, referring to the fact that Salars are descendants of Tibetan women marrying Salar men. After using these terms they often repeat the historical account how Tibetan women were married by 2,000 Salar men who were the First Salars to migrate to Qinghai. These terms illustrate that Salars were viewed separately from the Hui by Tibetans. According to legend, the marriages between Tibetan women and Salar men came after a compromise between demands by a Tibetan chief and the Salar migrants. The Salar say Wimdo valley was ruled by a Tibetan and he demanded the Salars follow 4 rules in order to marry Tibetan women. He asked them to install on their houses's four corners Tibetan Buddhist prayer flags, to pray with Tibetan Buddhist prayer wheels with the Buddhist mantra om mani padma hum and to bow before statues of Buddha. The Salars refused those demands saying they did not recite mantras or bow to statues since they believed in only one creator god and were Muslims. They compromised on the flags in houses by putting stones on their houses' corners instead of Tibetan Buddhist prayer flags. Some Tibetans do not differentiate between Salar and Hui due to their Islamic religion. In 1996, Wimdo township only had one Salar because Tibetans whined about the Muslim call to prayer and a mosque built in the area in the early 1990s so they kicked out most of the Salars from the region. Salars were bilingual in Salar and Tibetan due to intermarriage with Tibetan women and trading. It is far less likely for a Tibetan to speak Salar. Tibetan women in Xiahe also married Muslim men who came there as traders before the 1930s.

In eastern Qinghai and Gansu there were cases of Tibetan women who stayed in their Buddhist Lamaist religion while marrying Chinese Muslim men and they would have different sons who would be Buddhist and Muslims, the Buddhist sons became Lamas while the other sons were Muslims. Hui and Tibetans married Salars.

Manchuria 
Ethnic Russians first arrived in large numbers in Manchuria during the 1890s as colonists and marriages between Russian women and Han Chinese men started at the same time as the migration. The descendants of the interracial marriages are concentrated in the towns and villages of the frontier areas along the Ergun River of Inner Mongolia like Shiwei and Enhe. Interracial marriages between Chinese women and Russian men were rare, a marriage pattern that does not fit the European colonial convention of Western men marrying native women. Unions between Chinese and Russians were also rare in urban areas like Harbin where there was prejudice against mixed marriages on both sides.

Hong Kong 

Many Tanka women bore children with foreign men. Ernest John Eitel mentioned in 1889 how an important change had taken place among Eurasian girls, the offspring of illicit connections: instead of becoming concubines, they were commonly brought up respectably and married to Hong Kong Chinese husbands. Some believed many Hong Kong-born Eurasians were assimilated into the Hong Kong society by intermarriage with the Cantonese population. The world's most influential martial artist icon, Bruce Lee, was also born to parents of Hong Kong heritage to a Cantonese father and a Eurasian mother. Some European women also married with Cantonese such as Hollywood sex symbol Nancy Kwan born to a Cantonese architect, and Marquita Scott, a Caucasian model of English and Scottish ancestry.

Ernest John Eitel controversially claimed that most "half-caste" people in Hong Kong were descended exclusively from Europeans having relationships with Tanka women. The theory that most of the Eurasian mixed-race Hong Kong people are descended only from Tanka women and European men, and not ordinary Cantonese women, has been backed up by other researchers who pointed out that Tanka women freely consorted with foreigners because they were not bound by the same Confucian traditions as the Cantonese, and having relationships with European men was advantageous for Tanka women, but Lethbridge criticized it as "a 'myth' propagated by xenophobic Cantonese to account for the establishment of the Hong Kong Eurasian community". Carl Smith's study in the late 1960s on the protected women seems, to some degree, to support Eitel's theory. Smith says that the Tankas experienced certain restrictions within the traditional Chinese social structure. Being a group marginal to the traditional Chinese society of the Puntis (Cantonese), they did not have the same social pressure in dealing with Europeans. The ordinary Cantonese women did not sleep with European men; the Eurasian population was formed mostly from Tanka and European admixture.

They invaded Hongkong the moment the settlement was started, living at first on boats in the harbon with their numerons families, and gradually settling on shore. They have maintained ever since almost a monopoly of the supply of pilots and ships' crews, of the fish trade and the cattle trade, but unfortunately also of the trade in girls and women. Strange to say, when the settlement was first started, it was estimated that some 2,000 of these Tan-ka lieople had flocked to Hongkong, but at the present time they are abont the same number, a tendency having set in among them to settle on shore rather than on the water and to disavow their Tan-ka extraction in order to mix on equal terms with the mass of the Chinese community. The half-caste population in Hongkong were, from the earliest days of the settlement of the Colony and down to the present day, almost exclusively the off-spring of these Tan-ka people. But, like the Tan-ka people themselves, they are happily under the influence of a process of continuons re-absorption in the mass of the Chinese residents of the Colony.

Elizabeth Wheeler Andrew (1845–1917) and Katharine Caroline Bushnell (5 February 1856 26 January 1946), who wrote extensively on the position of women in the British Empire, wrote about the Tanka inhabitants of Hong Kong and their position in the prostitution industry, catering to foreign sailors. The Tanka did not marry with the Chinese; being descendants of the natives, they were restricted to the waterways. They supplied their women as prostitutes to British sailors and assisted the British in their military actions around Hong Kong. The Tanka in Hong Kong were considered "outcasts", and categorized as low class. Tanka women were ostracized from the Cantonese community, and were nicknamed "salt water girls" (ham shui mui) for their services as prostitutes to foreigners in Hong Kong.

South Asians have been living in Hong Kong throughout the colonial period, before the partition of India into the nations of India and Pakistan. They migrated to Hong Kong and worked as police officers as well as army officers during colonial rule. 25,000 of the Muslims in Hong Kong trace their roots back to Faisalabad in what is now Pakistan; around half of them belong to 'local boy' families, who descended from early Indian-Pakistani immigrants who took local Chinese wives mostly of Tanka origin.

Macau 
Due to a few Chinese living in Macau, the early Macanese ethnic group was formed from Portuguese men with Malay, Japanese, Indian women. The Portuguese encouraged Chinese migration to Macau, and most Macanese in Macau were formed from intermarriages between Portuguese and Chinese.

Rarely did Chinese women marry Portuguese; initially, mostly Goans, Ceylonese (from today's Sri Lanka), Indochinese, Malay, and Japanese women were the wives of the Portuguese men in Macau. Japanese girls would be purchased in Japan by Portuguese men. Many Chinese became Macanese simply by converting to Catholicism, and had no ancestry from Portuguese, having assimilated into the Macanese people. The majority of the early intermarriages of people from China with Portuguese were between Portuguese men and women of Tanka origin, who were considered the lowest class of people in China and had relations with Portuguese settlers and sailors, or low-class Chinese women. Western men were refused by high-class Chinese women, who did not marry foreigners, while a minority were Cantonese men and Portuguese women. Macanese men and women also married with the Portuguese and Chinese, and as a result some Macanese became indistinguishable from the Chinese or Portuguese population. Because the majority of the population who migrated to Macau were Cantonese, Macau became a culturally Cantonese speaking society; other ethnic groups became fluent in Cantonese. Most Macanese had paternal Portuguese heritage until 1974. It was in the 1980s that Macanese and Portuguese women began to marry men who defined themselves ethnically as Chinese.

Literature in Macau was written about love affairs and marriage between the Tanka women and Portuguese men, like "A-Chan, A Tancareira", by Henrique de Senna Fernandes. After the handover of Macau to China in 1999, many Macanese migrated to other countries. Many of the Portuguese and Macanese women who stayed in Macau married local Cantonese men, and many Macanese also now have Cantonese paternal heritage. There are between 25,000 – 46,000 Macanese, only 5000 – 8000 of whom live in Macau, while most live in America, Latin America, and Portugal. Unlike the Macanese of Macau who are strictly of Chinese and Portuguese heritage, many Macanese living abroad are not entirely of Portuguese and Chinese ancestry. Many Macanese men and women intermarried with the local population of America and Latin America, etc., and have only partial Macanese heritage.

Taiwan 
During the Siege of Fort Zeelandia in which Chinese Ming loyalist forces commanded by Koxinga besieged and defeated the Dutch East India Company and conquered Taiwan, the Chinese took Dutch women and children prisoner. Koxinga took Antonius Hambroek's teenage daughter as a concubine, and Dutch women were sold to Chinese soldiers to become their wives. In 1684 some of these Dutch wives were still captives of the Chinese.

Some Dutch physical features like auburn and red hair among people in regions of south Taiwan are a result of this episode of Dutch women becoming concubines to the Chinese commanders.

Japan 

Inter-ethnic marriage in Japan dates back to the 7th century, when Chinese and Korean immigrants began intermarrying with the local population. By the early 9th century, over one-third of all noble families in Japan had ancestors of foreign origin. In the 1590s, over 50,000 Koreans were forcibly brought to Japan, where they intermarried with the local population. In the 16th and 17th centuries, around 58,000 Japanese travelled abroad, many of whom intermarried with the local women in Southeast Asia.

Portuguese traders in Japan also intermarried with the local Christian women in the 16th and 17th centuries.

During the anti-Christian persecutions in 1596, many Japanese Christians fled to Macau and other Portuguese colonies such as Goa, where there was a community of Japanese slaves and traders by the early 17th century. The Japanese slaves were brought or captured by Portuguese traders from Japan. Intermarriage with the local populations in these Portuguese colonies also took place. Marriage and sexual relations between European merchants and Japanese women was usual during this period.

A large-scale slave trade developed in which Portuguese purchased Japanese as slaves in Japan and sold them to various locations overseas, including Portugal itself, throughout the sixteenth and seventeenth centuries. At least more than several hundreds of Japanese women, were sold sexual purposes. Many documents mention the slave trade along with protests against the enslavement of Japanese. Japanese slaves are believed to be the first of their nation to end up in Europe, and the Portuguese purchased many Japanese slave girls to bring to Portugal for sexual purposes, as noted by the Church in 1555. King Sebastian feared that it was having a negative effect on Catholic proselytization since the slave trade in Japanese was growing in larger proportions, so he commanded that it be banned in 1571.

Japanese slave women were occasionally even sold as concubines to Indian and African crewmembers, along with their European counterparts serving on Portuguese ships trading in Japan, mentioned by Luis Cerqueira, a Portuguese Jesuit, in a 1598 document. Japanese slaves were brought by the Portuguese to Macau, where some of them not only ended up being enslaved to the Portuguese, but as slaves to other slaves, with the Portuguese owning Malay and African slaves, who in turn owned Japanese slaves of their own.

Historian S. Kuznetsov, dean of the Department of History of the Irkutsk State University, one of the first researchers of the topic, interviewed thousands of former internees and came to the following conclusion: What is more, romantic relations between Japanese internees and Russian women were not uncommon. For example, in the city of Kansk, Krasnoyarsk Krai, about 50 Japanese married locals and stayed. Today many Russian women married Japanese men, often for the benefit of long-term residence and work rights. Some of their mixed offspring stay in Japan while other's to Russia.

In 2019, there were 599,007 marriages in Japan, of which 14,911 involved a non-Japanese bride and 7,008 involved a non-Japanese groom. Non-Japanese women who married a Japanese man were predominantly of Chinese (4,723), Filipino (3,666), Korean (1,678), Thai (986) and Brazilian (318) nationality. Non-Japanese men who married a Japanese woman were predominantly of Korean (1,764), United States (989), Chinese (917), Brazilian (332) nationality.

Korea 

There were 15,341 international marriages between Koreans and non-Koreans in 2020. Since 2005, the number of international marriages in Korea has been on the decline. About 7% of couples who married in 2020 were international couples.

Since the 1960s, young women had an incentive to move from countryside to the city due to the desire of chasing a better life. Hence, there are only young men remaining in their hometown to look after their farm and keep the agriculture industry going. About one third of South Korean men in rural areas married women from abroad, according to Korea National Statistics Office data published in 2006. Marriages between South Korean men and foreign women are often arranged by marriage brokers or international religious groups.

Interracial marriage in Korea dates back to at least the Three Kingdoms period. Records about the period, in particular the section in the Samguk Yusa about the Gaya kingdom (it was absorbed by the kingdom of Silla later), indicate that in 48 AD, King Kim Suro of Gaya (the progenitor of the Gimhae Kim clan) took a princess (Heo Hwang-ok) from the "Ayuta nation" as his bride and queen. "Ayuta" is the Korean name for the city of Ayodhya in India. Two major Korean clans today claim descent from this union.

Somewhat later, during the arrival of Muslims in Korea in the Middle Ages, a number of Arab, Persian and Turkic navigators and traders settled in Korea. They took local Korean wives and established several Muslim villages. Some assimilation into Buddhism and Shamanism eventually took place, owing to Korea's geographical isolation from the Muslim world. At least two or three major Korean clans today claim descent from Muslim families.

Southeast Asia 
Interracial marriage in Southeast Asia dates back to the spread of Indian culture, including Hinduism and Buddhism, to the region. From the 1st century onwards, mostly male traders and merchants from the Indian subcontinent frequently intermarried with the local female populations in Cambodia, Burma, Champa, central Thailand, the Malay Peninsula, the Philippines, and Indonesia. Many Indianized kingdoms rose in Southeast Asia during the Middle Ages.

From the 9th century onwards, some male Arab traders from the Middle East settled in Maritime Southeast Asia and married local Malay, Indonesian and Filipina female populations, which contributed to the spread of Islam in Southeast Asia. From the 14th to the 17th centuries, many Chinese, Indian and Arab traders settled within the kingdoms of Maritime Southeast Asia and married within local female populations. This tradition continued among Spain and Portuguese traders who also married within local populations. In the 16th and 17th centuries, thousands of Japanese people travelled to Southeast Asia and married with local women there.

Vietnam 

Much of the business conducted with foreign men in southeast Asia was done by the local women, who engaged in both sexual and mercantile intercourse with foreign male traders. A Portuguese- and Malay-speaking Vietnamese woman who lived in Macao for an extensive period of time was the person who interpreted for the first diplomatic meeting between Cochin-China and a Dutch delegation. She served as an interpreter for three decades in the Cochin-China court with an old woman who had been married to three husbands, one Vietnamese and two Portuguese. The cosmopolitan exchange was facilitated by the marriage of Vietnamese women to Portuguese merchants. Those Vietnamese woman were married to Portuguese men and lived in Macao which was how they became fluent in Malay and Portuguese.

Foreigners noted that in southeast Asian countries, foreigners would be offered already married local women for sex. William Dampier wrote, "The offering of Women is a Custom used by several nations in the East-Indies, as at Pegu, Siam, Cochinchina, and Cambodia... It is accounted a piece of Policy to do it; for the chief Factors and Captains of Ships have the great men's Daughters offered them, the Mandarins or Noblemen at Tunquin..." Dampier's full account said, "They are so free of their women, that they would bring them aboard and offer them to us; and many of our men hired them for a small matter. This is a custom used by several nations in the East Indies, as at Pegu, Siam, Cochin-China, and Cambodia, as I have been told. It is used at Tunquin also to my knowledge; for I did afterwards make a voyage thither, and most of our men had women on board all the time of our abode there. In Africa, also, on the coast of Guinea, our merchants, factors, and seamen that reside there, have their black misses. It is accounted a piece of policy to do it; for the chief factors and captains of ships have the great men's daughters offered them, the mandarins' or noblemen's at Tunquin, and even the King's wives in Guinea; and by this sort of alliance the country people are engaged to a greater friendship; and if there should arise any difference about trade, or any thing else, which might provoke the native to seek some treacherous revenge, to which all these heathen nations are very prone, then these Dalilahs would certainly declare it to their white friends, and so hinder their countrymen's design."

Alexander Hamilton said, "The Tonquiners used to be very desirous of having a brood of Europeans in their country, for which reason the greatest nobles thought it no shame or disgrace to marry their daughters to English and Dutch seamen, for the time they were to stay in Tonquin, and often presented their sons-in-law pretty handsomely at their departure, especially if they left their wives with child; but adultery was dangerous to the husband, for they are well versed in the art of poisoning."

Burma 
Burmese Muslims are the descendants of Indian Muslims, Arabs, Persians, Turks, Pathans, Chinese Muslims and Malays who settled and intermarried with the local Burmese population and other Burmese ethnic groups such as the Shan, Karen, and Mon.

During British Indian rule, millions of Indians, mostly Muslim, migrated there. The small population of mixed descendants of Indian men and local Burmese women are called "Zerbadees", often in a pejorative sense implying mixed race. The Rohingya claim to have descended from Bengalis who intermarried with the local women, but this remains a hotly contested issue. The political situation surrounding the actual history of the Rohingya, the lack of evidence, and the counter-claims, mean that proper ancestry cannot be established. The Panthays, a group of Chinese Muslims descended from West Asians and Central Asians, migrated from China and also intermarried with local Burmese females.

Burma has an estimated 52,000 Anglo-Burmese people, descended from British and Burmese people. Anglo-Burmese people frequently intermarried with Anglo-Indian immigrants, who assimilated into the Anglo-Burmese community.

Malaysia and Singapore 
In Malaysia and Singapore, the majority of inter-ethnic marriages are between Chinese and Indians. The offspring of such marriages are informally known as "Chindian". The Malaysian and Singaporean governments, however, only classify them by their father's ethnicity. As the majority of these marriages involve an Indian groom and Chinese bride, the majority of Chindians in Malaysia are usually classified as "Indian" by the Malaysian government. As for the Malays, who are predominantly Muslim, legal restrictions in Malaysia make it less common for them to intermarry with either the Indians, who are predominantly Hindu, or the Chinese, who are predominantly Buddhist and Taoist.

It is common for Arabs in Singapore and Malaysia to take local Malay wives, due to a common Islamic faith. The Chitty people, in Singapore and the Malacca state of Malaysia, are a Tamil people with considerable Malay descent, which was due to thousands of the first Tamil settlers taking local wives, since they did not bring along any of their own women with them. According to government statistics, the population of Singapore as of September 2007 was 4.68 million, of whom multiracial people, including Chindians and Eurasians, formed 2.4%. In 2007, 16.4% of all marriages in Singapore were inter-ethnic. The Peranakans are descendants of Chinese merchants who settled down in Malaysia and Singapore during the colonial era and married Malay women. There is also a significant minority population of Eurasians who are descended from Europeans – Singapore and Malaysia being former British colonies – and local women.

Philippines 

Centuries of migration, diaspora, assimilation, and cultural diversity have made most Filipinos open-minded in embracing interracial marriage and multiculturalism, especially after three centuries of Spanish colonization. Following independence in 1945, the Philippines has seen both small and large-scale immigration into the country, mostly involving Chinese, Americans, Europeans, Japanese, and South Asians. More recent migrations into the country by Koreans, Brazilians and other Southeast Asians have contributed to the enrichment of the country's ethnic landscape.

Thousands of interracial marriages between Americans and Filipinos have taken place since the United States took possession of the Philippines after the Philippine–American War. Due to the strategic location of the Philippines, as many as 21 bases and 100,000 military personnel were stationed there since the U.S. first colonized the islands in 1898. These bases were decommissioned in 1992 after the end of the Cold War, but left behind thousands of Amerasian children. The Pearl S. Buck International Foundation estimates there are 52,000 Amerasians scattered throughout the Philippines.

In the United States intermarriage among Filipinos with other races is common. They have the largest number of interracial marriages among Asian immigrant groups, as documented in California. It is also noted that 21.8% of Filipino Americans are of mixed blood, second among Asian Americans, and is the fastest growing.

Interracial marriages particularly among Southeast Asians are continually increasing. At present, there is an increasing number of Southeast Asian intermarriages, particularly between Filipinos and Malaysians (Dumanig, 2009). Such marriages have created an impact on language, religion and culture. Dumanig argues that Filipino-Malaysian couples no longer prefer their own ethnic languages as the medium of communication at home. The use of English with some switching in Bahasa Malaysia, Chinese, and Filipino is commonly used.

Philippine nationality law is currently based upon the principles of jus sanguinis and therefore descent from a parent who is a citizen/national of the Republic of the Philippines is the primary method of acquiring Philippine citizenship. Birth in the Philippines to foreign parents does not in itself confer Philippine citizenship, although RA9139, the Administrative Naturalization Law of 2000, does provide a path for administrative naturalization of certain aliens born on Philippine soil (Jus soli). Together, some of these recent immigrants have intermarried with the indigenous Filipinos, as well as with the previous immigrant groups, giving rise to Filipinos of mixed racial and/or ethnic origins also known as mestizos.

South Asia 

The Indian subcontinent has a long history of inter-ethnic marriage dating back to ancient India. Various groups of people have been intermarrying for millennia in the Indian subcontinent, including speakers of Dravidian, Indo-Aryan (Indic), Iranian, Austroasiatic, and Tibeto-Burman languages. This was particularly common in the northwestern and northeastern parts of the subcontinent where invaders of Central Asian origin often invaded throughout history.

Many Indian traders, merchants, and missionaries travelled to Southeast Asia (where Indianized kingdoms were established) and often took local wives from the region. The Romani people ("Gypsies") who have origins in the Indian subcontinent travelled westwards and also took local wives in Central Asia, the Middle East, and Europe. Genetic studies show that the majority of Romani males carry large frequencies of particular Y chromosomes (inherited paternally) that otherwise exist only in populations from South Asia, in addition to nearly a third of Romani females carrying particular mitochondrial DNA (inherited maternally) that is rare outside South Asia. Around 800, a ship carrying Persian Jews crashed in India. They settled in different parts of India and befriended and traded with the local Indian population. Intermarriage occurred, and to this day the Indian Jews physically resemble their surrounding Indian populations due to intermarriage.

There is also a case of Indian a princess marrying a king abroad. The Korean text Samguk Yusa about the Gaya kingdom (it was absorbed by the kingdom of Silla later), indicate that in 48 AD, King Kim Suro of Gaya (the progenitor of the Gimhae Kim clan) took Princess Heo from "Ayuta," as his bride and queen. According to the Samguk Yusa, the princess' parents had a dream sent by a god who told them about a king from a faraway land. That was King Kim Suro of the Gaya kingdom, in what is now the southeastern tip of South Korea.

In Goa during the late 16th and 17th centuries, there was a community of Japanese slaves and traders, who were either Japanese Christians fleeing anti-Christian sentiments in Japan, or Japanese slaves brought or captured by Portuguese traders and their South Asian lascar crewmembers from Japan. In both cases, they often intermarried with the local population in Goa. One offspring of such an intermarriage was Maria Guyomar de Pinha, born in Thailand to a Portuguese-speaking Japanese-Bengali father from Goa and a Japanese mother. In turn, she married the Greek adventurer Constantine Phaulkon.

Inter-ethnic marriages between European men and Indian women were somewhat common during the East India Company rule. According to the historian William Dalrymple, in the 1780s, more than one-third of the British men in India were leaving all their possessions to one or more Indian wives, or to Anglo-Indian children . The most famous intermarriage was between the Anglo-Indian resident James Achilles Kirkpatrick (who converted to Islam) and the Hyderabadi noblewoman, whose family claimed descent from the Prophet Muhammad, Khair-un-Nissa. During the British East India Company's rule in India in the late 18th century to early 19th century, it was initially common, especially for British officers and some soldiers, to marry local Indian wives but declined after the Indian rebellion of 1857. By the mid-19th century, there were around 40,000 British soldiers but less than 2,000 British officials present in India. The 600,000 strong Anglo-Indian community today, that grew in numbers due to marriage within and amongst each other, had begun from such unions. The 65,000 Burgher community of Sri Lanka was initially formed by the intermarriages of Dutch and Portuguese men with local Sinhalese and Tamil women. Intermarriage also took place in Britain during the 17th to 19th centuries, when the British East India Company brought thousands of Indian scholars, lascars and workers (mostly Bengali). Most of whom worked on British ships in transit around the world. A number of them also settled down in Britain and took local British wives. At the time the First World War began, 51,616 lascars were working in Britain. The novel "Two Leaves and a Bud" by Ananda depicts labourer women in a tea garden in India being exploited by a British assistant manager Reggie Hunt who exercised illegal power and harassment that led to many run away just from seeing his presence.

In Assam, local Indian women married several waves of Chinese migrants during British colonial times, to the point where it became hard to physically differentiate Chinese in Assam from locals during the time of their internment during the 1962 war, and the majority of these Chinese in Assam were married to Indian women, and some of these Indian women were deported to China with their husbands.

In the 19th century, when the British Straits Settlement shipped Chinese convicts to be jailed in India, the Chinese men then settled in the Nilgiri mountains near Naduvattam after their release and married Tamil Paraiyan women, having mixed Chinese-Tamil children with them. They were documented by Edgar Thurston. Paraiyan is also anglicized as "pariah".

Edgar Thurston described the colony of the Chinese men with their Tamil pariah wives and children: "Halting in the course of a recent anthropological expedition on the western side of the Nilgiri plateau, in the midst of the Government Cinchona plantations, I came across a small settlement of Chinese, who have squatted for some years on the slopes of the hills between Naduvatam and Gudalur, and developed, as the result of ' marriage ' with Tamil pariah women, into a colony, earning an honest livelihood by growing vegetables, cultivating coffee on a small scale, and adding to their income from these sources by the economic products of the cow. An ambassador was sent to this miniature Chinese Court with a suggestion that the men should, in return for monies, present themselves before me with a view to their measurements being recorded. The reply which came back was in its way racially characteristic as between Hindus and Chinese. In the case of the former, permission to make use of their bodies for the purposes of research depends essentially on a pecuniary transaction, on a scale varying from two to eight annas. The Chinese, on the other hand, though poor, sent a courteous message to the effect that they did not require payment in money, but would be perfectly happy if I would give them, as a memento, copies of their photographs." Thurston further describe a specific family: "The father was a typical Chinaman, whose only grievance was that, in the process of conversion to Christianity, he had been obliged to 'cut him tail off.' The mother was a typical Tamil Pariah of dusky hue. The colour of the children was more closely allied to the yellowish tint of the father than to the dark tint of the mother; and the semimongol parentage was betrayed in the slant eyes, flat nose, and (in one case) conspicuously prominent cheek-bones." Thurston's description of the Chinese-Tamil families were cited by others, one mentioned "an instance mating between a Chinese male with a Tamil Pariah female". A 1959 book described attempts made to find out what happened to the colony of mixed Chinese and Tamils.

An increasing number of non-Tibetan Muslim men are marrying Ladakhi Tibetan Buddhist women in Ladakh.

The Balti people of Baltistan in Pakistan and Kargil in India are descendants of Tibetan Buddhists who  converted to the Noorbakshia sect of Islam. With the passage of time a large number converted to Shia Islam, and a few converted to Sunni Islam. Their Balti language is highly archaic and conservative and closer to Classical Tibetan than other Tibetan languages. The Balti are speakers of a conservative Tibetan dialect in northern Pakistan, Baltistant. Most other Tibetan dialects lost Classical Tibetan consonant clusters that are preserved in Balti. However DNA testing revealed that while Tibetan  mtDNA makes up te majority of the Balti's female ancestry, the Balti paternal ancestry has foreign Near Eastern Y haplogroups of non-Tibetan origin.

Europe

France 
According to official records in 1918 of the Vietnamese men and French women marriages, 250 had married officially and 1363 couples were living together without the approval of the French parental consent and without the approval of French authorities.

During World War I, there were 135,000 soldiers from British India, a large number of soldiers from French North Africa, and 20,000 labourers from South Africa, who served in France. Much of the French male population had gone to war, leaving behind a surplus of French females, many of whom formed interracial relationships with non-white soldiers, mainly Indian and North African. British and French authorities allowed foreign Muslim soldiers to intermarry with local French females on the basis of Islamic law, which allows marriage between Muslim men and Christian women. On the other hand, Hindu soldiers in France were restricted from intermarriage on the basis of the Indian caste system.

According to some historical research, French are less likely to display a conflictive look on interracial marriage compared to other nations. One study suggests that a look into their film history is a good indication of this. They display less conflict around the issue of interracial marriage in many of their culturally significant films. However, it is unknown if this is truly evidence of less social stigma around the issue or rather a way to ignore the stigma around the issue altogether.

Germany 

The administrations of the German colonies in Africa and the South Seas enacted bans on marriages with non-European natives in the early 20th century. When the issue was debated in the Reichstag in 1912, this ban was rejected by a majority and an inclusive marriage law was demanded (see German interracial marriage debate (1912)). However, it never came to pass because of the beginning of World War I a few years later.

Nazi Germany introduced the Nuremberg Laws in 1935, among which was the Law for the Protection of German Blood and German Honour that banned marital as well as extramarital relations between Germans (incl. people deemed to be racially similar, colloquially Aryans) and Jews. Although Slavs could be in theory included as Aryans, Nazi Germany's legal practice consisted in strict segregation of Germans and most subjugated Slavs and harsh punishment for miscegenation, as exemplified by the Polish decrees of 1940.

Iberian Peninsula 
Interracial marriage existed to some extent in the early part of the history of Iberia, particularly the Islamic period from the 8th to 14th centuries and in the early modern era, during which minorities of north African origin resided in Portugal and southern Spain.

Portuguese colonies 

According to Gilberto Freyre, a Brazilian sociologist, miscegenation was commonplace in the Portuguese colonies, and was even supported by the court as a way to boost low populations and guarantee a successful and cohesive settlement. Thus, settlers often released African slaves to become their wives. The children were guaranteed full Portuguese citizenship, provided the parents were married. Some former Portuguese colonies have large mixed-race populations, for instance, Brazil, Cape Verde, Mozambique, Timor Leste, Macau and São Tomé and Príncipe. In the case of Brazil, the influential "Indianist" novels of José de Alencar (O Guarany, Iracema, and Ubirajara) perhaps went farther than in the other colonies, advocating miscegenation in order to create a truly Brazilian race. Mixed marriages between Portuguese and locals in former colonies were very common in all Portuguese colonies. Miscegenation was still common in Africa until the independence of the former Portuguese colonies in the mid-1970s.

Iceland 
Most Icelanders are descendants of Norwegian settlers and Celts from Ireland and Scotland, brought over as slaves during the age of settlement. Recent DNA analysis suggests that around 66% of the male settler-era population was of Norse ancestry, whereas the female population was 60% Celtic.

Italian Peninsula 
As was the case in other areas occupied, it was acceptable in Islamic marital law for a Muslim male to marry Christian and Jewish females in southern Italy when under Islamic rule – namely, the Emirate of Sicily, and, of least importance, the short-lived Emirate of Bari between the 8th and 11th centuries. In this case, most intermarriages were between Arab and Berber males from North Africa and the local Roman and Italian females. Such intermarriages were particularly common in the Emirate of Sicily, where one writer visiting the place in the 970s expressed shock at how common it was in rural areas. After the Norman conquest of southern Italy, all Muslim citizens (whether foreign, native or mixed) of the Kingdom of Sicily were known as "Moors". After a brief period when the Arab-Norman culture had flourished under the reign of Roger II of Sicily, later the mainlander Italians migrated to Sicily persecuted the Muslims of Sicily and they killed many of them; later the remnants were expelled in 1239 with the persecution of Frederick II, who deported the Muslim survivors in Lucera.

In Malta, Arabs and Italians from neighbouring Sicily and Calabria intermarried with the local inhabitants, who were descended from Phoenicians, Romans and Vandals. The Maltese people are descended from such unions, and the Maltese language is descended from Siculo-Arabic.

At times, the Italian city-states also played an active role in the Arab slave trade, where Moorish and Italian traders occasionally exchanged slaves. For example, two researchers suggest that Leonardo da Vinci's mother Caterina may have been a slave from the Middle East.

United Kingdom 

Britain has a long history of interethnic marriage among the various European populations that inhabited the island, including the Celtic, Roman, Viking, Anglo-Saxon and Anglo-Norman peoples. In the late 15th century, the Romani people arrived. The arriving Romani nomads intermarried with the British population, forming a distinct community known as the Romnichal. Due to intermarriage, Romnichal today are often indistinguishable from the general white British population.

Inter-ethnic marriage began occurring more often in Britain since the 17th century, when the British East India Company began bringing over many Indian scholars, lascars, servants and workers. A lack of anti-miscegenation laws in Britain increased the frequency of such unions. By the mid-19th century, there were more than 40,000 Indian seamen, diplomats, scholars, soldiers, officials, tourists, businessmen and students arriving (normally temporarily) to Britain. By the late 19th century and early 20th century, there were around 70,000 South Asians working on British ships, 51,616 of whom were lascar seamen working on British merchant ships for the Royal Navy when the First World War broke out. Families with South Asian lascar fathers and white mothers established small interracial families in Britain's dock areas. This led to a number of "mixed race" children being born in the country. The small number of ethnic minority women in Britain were often outnumbered by "half-caste Indian" daughters born from white mothers and Indian fathers although mixed race families were still very unusual in Britain at this time. In addition, a number of British officers who had Indian wives and Anglo-Indian children in British India often brought them over to Britain in the 19th century. From the 1890s onwards, small numbers of Chinese began to set up businesses catering to the Chinese sailors working on Holt's lines and others. Some of these men married working class British women, resulting in a number of British-born Eurasian Chinese being born in Liverpool. The first Chinese immigrants were mainly Cantonese from south China, with some also from Shanghai. The figures of Chinese for 1921 are 2,157 men and 262 women. Many Chinese men married British women while others remained single, possibly supporting a wife and family back home in China. During the Second World War (1939–45) another wave of Chinese seamen from Shanghai and of Cantonese origin married British women. Records show that about some 300 of these men had married British women and supported families.

Following the end of the First World War, there were significantly more females than males in Britain, and there were increasing numbers of sailors from the Indian subcontinent, the Middle East and the West Indies. A number of the sailors intermarried and settled down with local British women, which led to tensions and a number of race riots breaking out in Cardiff, London and Liverpool. By the Second World War, hostility towards such unions had increased, though such views were in the minority. In 1932, an Indian National Congress (INC) survey of "all Indians outside India"" estimated that there were 7,128 Indians living in the United Kingdom, which included students, professionals such as doctors and lascars.

Male immigrants and visitors to Britain have occasionally intermarried with British women, particularly during the 20th century. These include South Asian lascars before and after the First World War, Arab and Indian immigrants during the interwar period, African American GIs during the Second World War, Maltese and Cypriot cafe owners in the 1940s to 1950s, West Indian immigrants in the 1950s to 1960s, and a new wave of South Asian immigrants in the 1960s. These relationships were marked by an increase in inter-ethnic tensions, though the actual impact of such unions remains a topic of debate among scholars and historians.

According to the 2001 census of Britain, Black British males were around 50% more likely than black females to marry outside their race. British Chinese women (30%) were twice as likely as their male counterparts (15%) to marry someone from a different ethnic group. In 2001, 2% of all marriages in the United Kingdom were inter-ethnic. In 2011 the census showed that almost one in 10 people in Britain were either married or living with someone from a different ethnic group, with proportions ranging from 85% of mixed-race people to 4% of white people.

In 1948, an international incident was created when the British government took exception to the "difficult problem" of the marriage of Seretse Khama and Ruth Williams, whom he had met while studying law in London. The interracial marriage sparked a furore among both the tribal elders of the Bamangwato and the apartheid government of South Africa. The latter objected to the idea of an interracial couple ruling just across their northern border, and exerted pressure to have Khama removed from his chieftainship. Britain's Labour government, then heavily in debt from World War II, could not afford to lose cheap South African gold and uranium supplies. They also feared South Africa might take direct action against Bechuanaland, Khama's homeland, through economic sanctions or a military incursion. The British government began a parliamentary enquiry into Khama's fitness for the chieftainship. Though the investigation reported that he was eminently fit for the rule of Bechuanaland, "but for his unfortunate marriage", the government ordered the report suppressed. (It would remain so for thirty years.) It exiled Khama and his wife from Bechuanaland in 1951. It was many years before the couple was allowed to live in Africa, and several more years before Khama became president of what is now Botswana. Their son Ian Khama served as the president of that country decades later.

According to the 2011 census, people who were cohabiting were more likely to be in an inter-ethnic relationship, than people who were married or in a civil partnership (12% vs 8%). This was the case for all ethnic groups except Other White, where the proportions were the same (39%). The pattern for inter-ethnic relationships for those married or in a civil partnership and those who were cohabiting was similar to the overall picture of inter-ethnic relationships across the ethnic groups – with the Mixed/Multiple ethnic groups as the most likely and White British the least likely. The largest differences between people who were married and cohabiting were in the Asian ethnic groups. Bangladeshis who were cohabiting were nearly seven times more likely to be in an inter-ethnic relationship than Bangladeshis who were married or in a civil partnership (39% compared with 6%). Indians (56% compared with 10%) and Pakistanis (41% compared with 8%) were around five times more likely. Two thirds (65%) of Other Asians cohabiting were in an inter-ethnic relationship compared with 28% who were married (or in civil partnership). In the Other ethnic groups, nearly three quarters of Arabs (72%) and Any Other ethnic groups (74%) cohabiting were in inter ethnic relationships, compared with almost a third (31%) of Arabs and over a third (37%) of Any Other ethnic group who were married (or in a civil partnership). The proportion of people in inter-ethnic relationships was lower in 2001, compared to 2011. Some 6% of people who were married in 2001 were in an inter-ethnic relationship compared to 10% who were cohabiting.

Examples
 Somali Iman (model) and English David Bowie married from 1992 until his death in 2016.
 Robert De Niro and his African American wife Grace Hightower married from 1997 until 2018.
 African American Paula Patton and her European American husband Robin Thicke married from 2005 until 2015.
 Black British Seal (musician) and German Heidi Klum married from 2005 until 2014. 
 Afro-Asian American Tiger Woods and Swedish Elin Nordegren married from 2004 until 2010.

See also 
 List of interracial romance films
 Loving Day
 Mixed Race Day
 Race of the future
 Race traitor
 Transnational marriage

References

Notes

Citations

External links
 
 A Black Nurse, a German Soldier and an Unlikely WWII Romance, The New York Times
 Cultural Differences, The Yale Review

 
Marriage reform
Physical attractiveness
Sexual attraction